Peter Richard Michael Williams (born June 1974) is a British businessman, the co-founder, 52% owner, and CEO of the clothing brand Jack Wills.

Early life
Peter Williams was born in June 1974. He was educated at King Edward's School, Birmingham, where he was school captain, followed by a bachelor's degree in economics from University College London.

Career
Peter Williams and Robert Shaw founded Jack Wills in 1999. Williams was 23 when the first store opened at 22 Fore Street, Salcombe and it was created with £40,000 – the founders slept above the shop. The brand was named after his grandfather, Jack Williams.

In 2012, Williams debuted on the Sunday Times Rich List, with an estimated worth of £200 million ($326 million).

In October 2016, Williams and private equity firm BlueGem became the joint owners, after long-standing investor Inflexion left after nine years. Williams owns 52% of the company.

Personal life
Williams has known his wife, Laura Jane Williams, since he was 12 years old.

References

1974 births
Alumni of University College London
Living people
People educated at King Edward's School, Birmingham